The 1938 Chatham Cup became the 15th nationwide knockout football competition in New Zealand, after a two-year gap caused by the lack of a 1937 Chatham Cup competition (see 1936 Chatham Cup for explanation).

The competition was run on a regional basis, with regional associations each holding separate qualifying rounds.

Teams taking part in are known to have included: Runanga and Taylorville (Westland), Millerton All Blacks (Buller), Maori Hill, Mosgiel and Northern (Otago), Glen Massey, Hamilton Wanderers, and Huntly Starr (South Auckland/Waikato) Nomads, St. Albans, Western and Christchurch Thistle (Canterbury), Petone, Miramar Rangers, Diamond, Seatoun, Marist, Waterside. Hospital, Scottish Wanderers, and Technical Old Boys (Wellington), Ponsonby, Eastern Suburbs, Auckland Thistle, and Abels (Auckland).

Millerton All Blacks withdrew from the competition in early July.

The South Auckland FA (SAFA) provincial finals, contested by Huntly Starr, Hamilton Wanderers and Glen Massey, took a month and five scheduled matches to complete, after the first round match between Huntly Starr and Wanderers had to be replayed over three match days. Two protests by Wanderers were successfully upheld by the SAFA. The first match in Huntly was won 3 - 2 by Huntly Starr, the second was won 3 - 0 by Huntly Starr, the third was drawn 0 - 0 aet. The fourth replay, a mid-week fixture on 27 July, was won by default as Wanderers made the journey to Huntly, but the Starr players were absent. A 15-minute grace period from the match referee was allowed, then the tie was awarded to Hamilton Wanderers. Two days later Hamilton Wanderers beat Glen Massey 6 - 1 at Seddon Park in the South Auckland provincial final. The very next day, 30 July, Hamilton Wanderers met Ponsonby at Seddon Park in the Auckland regional final, losing 3 - 1 to the Auckland provincial winners.

The 1938 final
The final was played in soggy conditions to which Mosgiel found it difficult to adapt. Despite playing with the breeze in the first half, the southerners were 1-0 down after just six minutes through a goal from Sonny Ward. Shortly after the half-time break Tom Walker doubled the lead, and a third was added by Toby Janes at the hour mark after a pass from Ward. Walker completed the scoring with a tap-in late on in the second half. 

The fifth Governor-General of New Zealand, George Monckton-Arundell, 8th Viscount Galway, presented the trophy to Waterside after the match.

Results

Semi-finals ("Island finals")

Final

References

Rec.Sport.Soccer Statistics Foundation New Zealand 1938 page

Chatham Cup
Chatham Cup
Chatham Cup